Podkurnovo is a rural locality (a village) in Sukhonskoye Rural Settlement, Mezhdurechensky District, Vologda Oblast, Russia. The population was 9 as of 2002.

Geography 
Podkurnovo is located 6 km south of Shuyskoye (the district's administrative centre) by road. Matveytsevo is the nearest rural locality.

References 

Rural localities in Mezhdurechensky District, Vologda Oblast